Bali Bird Park, is a tourist attraction in Bali, Indonesia. The Bird Park houses more than 1,000 birds representing more than 250 species in an enclosed aviary.

Conservation Park

Bali Bird Park aims to be a “Centre of Excellence” for the breeding of Birds of Paradise and Bali Starling. There are a lot of birds breeding in the park simultaneously all the year round.

The park has been landscaped to create natural habitats. Incorporates a diverse botanical collection. Features 52 different species of palms, rare jungle fruit trees, cycads, bamboos and cactus. 
There are 3 lakes hosting various species of water birds. A total of 60 bird enclosures with habitats to house the collection.

Events and activities

 Papua Rainforest Feeding. 09:30 & 12:45
 Pelican Feeding. 10:00 & 13:15
 Basic Instinct (Bird of Prey Show). 11:30 & 15:00
 Meet The Bird Stars (Bali Starling Restaurant). 12:00, 13:30, & 16:30
 4D Cinema. 10:00, 11:00, 12:00, 12:30, 13:00, 13:30, 14:00, 14:30, 15:30, 16:30, 17:00
 Lory Feeding. 09:45, 12:45, & 13:30
 Bali Rainforest (Free Flight Bird Show). 10:30 & 16:00
 Guyu-Guyu Corner (Hands on Birds). 09:00 - 17:30
 The Komodo Experience. Tuesday 11:00 & Friday 14:30

Facilities

 Bali Starling Restaurant
 Children play area 
 Rainforest Cafe
 Retailshop Sebun
 3 Toilets in the park
 Car parking

Location

Bali Bird Park is located inside the town of Batubulan, Gianyar on the road to Ubud. Approximately 45 minutes from Ngurah Rai Airport.

Google map: Bali Bird Park Direction

References

External links

 

Zoos in Indonesia
Tourist attractions in Bali
Aviaries
1994 establishments in Indonesia
Bird parks
Buildings and structures in Bali
Zoos established in 1994